The seventh World Series of Poker Europe (WSOPE) took place from October 11, 2013 to October 25, 2013, at Casino Barriere in Enghien-les-Bains, France. There were eight bracelet events.

Event schedule

Main Event

The 2013 World Series of Poker Europe Main Event began on October 19 and finished October 25. The event drew 375 entrants, generating a prize pool of €3,600,000. The top 40 players finished in the money, with the winner earning €1,000,000.

Final table

*-Career statistics prior to start of 2013 WSOPE Main Event

Final table results

Notes

World Series of Poker Europe
2013 in poker